Station Road is a football ground and training complex located in Newbridge, County Kildare, Ireland. It is home to Leinster Senior League outfit Newbridge Town F.C. It was also the home of now defunct Eircom League Division One side Kildare County F.C.

The ground was bought in the early 1980s by Newbridge Town F.C. The ground itself is located beside Newbridge railway station and hence was named Station Road. During the years Newbridge Town F.C. have developed Station Road and it now contains a sports hall, a clubhouse, training facilities, new all-weather pitches, showers and dressing rooms. The founding of Kildare County in 2002 saw the erection of floodlights and the development of a 250-seater stand (250 seats and a corporate area for 70). There was plans for the construction of a new 1,100-seat stand. 

However two separate 300-seat uncovered stands were erected on the Milltown side of the ground in August 2008 instead. Further up grade work including turnstiles, realigning and lengthening of the pitch to 95 metres as well as the erection of screen fencing at the rear of the Town goals, additional security monitoring, the installation of lightning protection is also planned.

Images from Station Road

References

External links 
Photographs of Station Road Facilities

Association football venues in the Republic of Ireland
Sports venues in County Kildare
Kildare County F.C.